Her Inspiration is a 1918 American silent drama film, directed by Robert Thornby. It stars May Allison, Herbert Heyes, and Charles Edler, and was released on December 30, 1918.

Cast list
 May Allison as Kate Kendall
 Herbert Heyes as Harold Montague
 Charles Edler as Curt Moots
Allan D. Sears as Big Hank
 Jack Brammall as Looney Lige

References

External links 
 
 
 

1918 drama films
1918 films
Silent American drama films
American silent feature films
American black-and-white films
Films directed by Robert Thornby
Metro Pictures films
1910s English-language films
1910s American films